Anydrelia dharmsalae is a moth in the family Geometridae. It is found in India.

References

Moths described in 1883
Asthenini
Moths of Asia